Drama at Eight was an American television program which was broadcast on the now defunct DuMont Television Network. The series ran during the summer of 1953. It was a dramatic anthology which aired Thursday nights from 8 to 8:30 PM (giving the series its name) on most DuMont affiliates. The series was cancelled after just four episodes were broadcast, although additional episodes continued to air locally on DuMont's New York station, WABD until October 1, 1953.

See also
List of programs broadcast by the DuMont Television Network
List of surviving DuMont Television Network broadcasts

References

Bibliography
David Weinstein, The Forgotten Network: DuMont and the Birth of American Television (Philadelphia: Temple University Press, 2004) 
Alex McNeil, Total Television, Fourth edition (New York: Penguin Books, 1980) 
Tim Brooks and Earle Marsh, The Complete Directory to Prime Time Network TV Shows, Third edition (New York: Ballantine Books, 1964)

External links
DuMont historical website

DuMont Television Network original programming
1950s American anthology television series
1953 American television series debuts
1953 American television series endings
Lost television shows
Black-and-white American television shows